John Stackhouse may refer to:

 John Stackhouse (botanist) (1742–1819), English botanist
 John Stackhouse (colonial administrator), administrator of the English East India Company
 John Stackhouse (journalist) (born 1962), Canadian journalist
 John G. Stackhouse Jr. (born 1960), Canadian scholar of religion